Prakit Deeprom (born January 7, 1988), simply known as Kit, is a Thai professional footballer who plays as a midfielder for Thai League 2 club Nakhon Si United and the Thailand national team.

International career

In November 9, 2014 Prakit scored in a friendly match against Philippines. Prakit was also part of Thailand's winning squad in the 2014 AFF Suzuki Cup. During the last group stage game against Myanmar Prakit scored the second goal of a 2-0 win with a well hit free kick. He also provided a lovely assist for Kroekrit Thaweekarn in another 3-0 win over the Philippines in the semi-finals.

International

International goals
Scores and results list Thailand's goal tally first.

|-
| 1. || November 9, 2014  || 80th Birthday Stadium, Thailand ||  ||  ||  || Friendly  
|-
| 2. || November 29, 2014 || Jalan Besar Stadium, Singapore  ||  ||  ||  || 2014 AFF Championship
|-
|3. || March 30, 2015 || Rajamangala Stadium, Thailand  ||  ||  ||  || Friendly
|-
|}

Honours

Club
Buriram United
 Thai League 1 (1): 2015
 Thai FA Cup (1): 2015
 Thai League Cup (1): 2015 
 Kor Royal Cup (1): 2015
 Mekong Club Championship (1): 2015
Muangthong United
 Thai League Cup (1): 2017
 Mekong Club Championship (1): 2017

International
Thailand
 ASEAN Football Championship (2): 2014, 2016
 King's Cup (1): 2016

References

External links

1988 births
Living people
Prakit Deeprom
Prakit Deeprom
Association football midfielders
Prakit Deeprom
Prakit Deeprom
Prakit Deeprom
Prakit Deeprom
Prakit Deeprom
Prakit Deeprom
Prakit Deeprom
Prakit Deeprom
Prakit Deeprom
Prakit Deeprom
Nakhon Si United F.C. players